James Koskiniemi (born February 16, 1977) is an American chef who is the recipient of the San Francisco Chefs Association 2010 Chef of the Year. James worked as the Executive Chef of The Bellevue Club in Oakland, California and as of September 2014 he became chef and co-founder of The Pig and The Pickle – Ale Industries Marketplace in Concord California. He was a writer for the Culinarian Magazine, and served two terms as President of the board of directors of the San Francisco Chefs Association – Chefs Association of the Pacific Coast ACF. He appeared on the cover of the February 2008 issue of the Culinarian Magazine.

When Chef James was six years old he won first place in a men's cooking competition and a culinary award from Alice Waters. At an early age he was introduced to Traditional French cooking by his father Ken who studied under Master Chef Ken Wolfe, and baking and pastry from his mother Peggy.

Chef James has an Associate of Occupational Studies in Le Cordon Bleu degree from the California Culinary Academy in San Francisco, California, and was the only one to graduate with full honors at the top of his class out of almost 700 students. In June 2007 Chef James was invited by the Adopt a Ship Program as a Chef Instructor on the Navy's  to train Culinary specialists in traditional techniques and help oversee the production of over 1200 meals per day.

He served as the youngest President and Director of the San Francisco Chefs Association. On October 17, 2010, Chef James won first place for preparing Crab and Potato Croquettes with a Sweet Kiwi Foam at the 10th annual Crabby Chef competition held at Spengers Fish Grotto in Berkeley, California. He repeated his victory a year later at the final Crabby Chef competition with Crab and Corn Beignets with a Ginger Honey Ver Jus. Chef James made an appearance on an episode of the Food Network Show Restaurant: Impossible Chef James works with several local charities such as Special Olympics, NFL Alumni For Kids, East Bay Agency for Children, and Raphael House. He was auctioned off in 2012 for over $30,000 at the Raphael House Gala in May 2012.

Publications 

 Koskiniemi, James. Sip and a Tastehttp://sfchefs.org/august07.pdf.
 Koskiniemi, James. Sip and a Tastehttp://sfchefs.org/sept07.pdf.
 Koskiniemi, James. Presidents Pagehttp://sfchefs.org/Feb08.pdf.
 Koskiniemi, James. Presidents Pagehttp://sfchefs.org/Mar08.pdf.
 Koskiniemi, James. Presidents Pagehttp://sfchefs.org/Apr08.pdf.

References 
 Burrell, Jackie. "http://www.mercurynews.com/entertainment/ci_27337770/review-concords-pig-pickle-is-charmer".
 Koskiniemi, James. http://www.chefjamessf.com.
 Serda, Clyde. http://sfchefs.org//Jan08.pdf.
 Smith, Erin. http://sfchefs.org/Feb08.pdf.
 Harris, Robert. http://www.navy.mil/search/display.asp?story_id=30878.
 Harris, Robert. http://www.militarychef.com/1A/1_Sections/News/News_Navy/NewsNavy070730.html.
 Harrants, Michael. http://www.mageesbakeryfarm.com/articles/page.asp?articleid=7515.
 Cobb, Cassey.  http://academiewines.com/content/chef-james-koskiniemi.
 Rufus, Anneli. http://www.eastbayexpress.com/92510/archives/2010/10/17/croquettes-with-kiwifruit-foam-win-berkeley-cooking-contest.

External links 
 

1977 births
Living people
American chefs
American male chefs
American restaurateurs
Writers from Portland, Oregon
Cuisine of the San Francisco Bay Area
American food writers
Chefs from San Francisco